Virgin Voyager may refer to:

British Rail Class 220, train known as the Virgin Voyager when operated by Virgin Trains
British Rail Class 221, train known as the Virgin Super Voyager when operated by Virgin Trains
Virgin Voyages, cruise line operator